A total of seven special routes of U.S. Route 90 exist.

Texas
All of the alternate and business routes within Texas are maintained by the Texas Department of Transportation (TxDOT). U.S. Route 90 has one alternate route and two business routes within the state. Along US 90, TxDOT identifies each business route as Business U.S. Highway followed by an alphabetic suffix. Along Texas U.S. routes, the alphabetic suffixes on business route names ascend eastward and northward. There are gaps in the alphabetic values to allow for future system expansion or for decommissioned routes. The alphabetic naming suffixes are included as small letters on the bottom of route shields.

Seguin–Houston alternate

U.S. Highway 90 Alternate is an alternate route to U.S. Highway 90 in the U.S. state of Texas, running from west of Seguin east via Seguin, Gonzales, Hallettsville, Eagle Lake, Rosenberg and Sugar Land to northeastern Houston. South of Downtown Houston, US 90 Alternate is built to freeway and near-freeway standards along a section of South Main Street.

Houston–Crosby business loop

Business U.S Highway 90-U or Bus. US 90-U is a business route from  I-610 in Houston northeastward to  FM 2100 in Crosby along portions of McCarty St. and the Beaumont Highway in northeastern Harris County.

The business route was created in 1992 when US 90 was realigned off the route between Beltway 8 and FM 2100. The portion of the business route between I-610 and Beltway 8 remained concurrent with US 90 until the completion of the current US 90 along the Crosby Freeway in January 2011.

Orange business loop

Business U.S. Highway 90-Y or Bus. US 90-Y begins at Exit 874A of the combined route of Interstate 10 and US 90 on the west side of Orange in Orange County. The route proceeds to the east along W. Park Ave. to  FM 3247 where the route turns to the southeast along Strickland Dr. through western Pinehurst. After reentering Orange, the route is joined by  SH 87, and the combined route proceeds to the east along MacArthur Dr. After SH 87 turns off of the route, Bus. US 90-Y continues east along Green Ave past  FM 1006 and then turns north along Simmons Dr. returning to I-10 and US 90 at Exit 878.

The business route follows the former alignment of US 90 through Orange until April 30, 1962. With the realignment, the route was designated State Highway Loop 358 but was signed as a US 90 business route. That designation was canceled and replaced with the current designation on June 21, 1990.

Louisiana

Lake Charles business route

Lafayette business route

Morgan City business route

U.S. Highway 90 Business is a business route of U.S. Highway 90 that goes from Louisiana Highway 182 at Morgan City to Louisiana Highway 662 at Amelia, Louisiana.

New Orleans business route

U.S. Highway 90 Business (officially U.S. Highway 90-Z) is a business route of U.S. Highway 90 in and near New Orleans, Louisiana, United States. Unlike a standard business route, it is built to higher standards than the segment of U.S. 90 that it parallels, with over half built to freeway standards and designated (but not signed as) Interstate 910. It crosses the Mississippi River on the Crescent City Connection and runs along the Westbank Expressway west of the bridge and part of the Pontchartrain Expressway in the New Orleans Central Business District. On the other hand, U.S. 90 runs along surface streets through New Orleans, crossing the Mississippi on the older and narrower Huey P. Long Bridge.

Alabama

Mobile truck route

Florida

Pensacola alternate

U.S. Highway 90 Alternate is an east–west bypass route of Pensacola, Florida. It is also known as Nine Mile Road, as it is located exactly nine miles north of downtown Pensacola. The route was designated and completed in the 1940s.

Interstate 10 has largely supplanted the role of U.S. 90 Alternate as a bypass route.  The road today serves largely as a commercial corridor for the northern suburbs of Pensacola.  However, following the partial destruction of the Escambia Bay Bridge by Hurricane Ivan in September 2004, U.S. 90 Alternate resumed its role as a cross-county route for a couple of months until the bridge reopened.

Jacksonville alternate

U.S. Highway 90 Alternate is an alternate route of U.S. Highway 90 in Jacksonville, Florida, United States. It runs from the split of Beach Boulevard and Atlantic Boulevard east along Atlantic Boulevard (State Road 10; US 90 and SR 212 use Beach Boulevard) to Southside Boulevard (State Road 115), where it turns south to end at Beach Boulevard (US 90/SR 212).

Former routes

Mobile alternate

Tallahassee alternate

U.S. Route 90 Alternate in Tallahassee was a former segment of US 90 from 1926–1949 that existed only in 1950 as an alternate route. It ran from Tallahassee to Quincy along what is today US 27 (Hidden State Road 63) and State Road 12. The route was co-signed with US 27 from Tallahassee to Havana.

References

90
 
90
90
90